The 2012–13 Ukrainian Cup  was the 22nd annual season of Ukraine's football knockout competition.

The Cup began with two preliminary rounds, before the first round proper involving the Premier League clubs. The draw for both the preliminary rounds was held on 5 July 2012. The First Preliminary Round consisting of teams from Druha Liha and Amateur Cup finalists. In the Second Preliminary Round teams of the Persha Liha entered the competition. Sixteen teams, the winners of the 2nd preliminary round, entered the First Round proper or the Round of 32 where the Premier League teams entered the competition for the first time. The winner of the competition qualified for the play-off round (based on the UEFA club coefficient) of the 2013–14 UEFA Europa League.

Team allocation 

Fifty five teams entered into the Ukrainian Cup competition.

Distribution

Round and draw dates
All draws held at FFU headquarters (Building of Football) in Kyiv unless stated otherwise.

 Originally scheduled on 23 September 2012

 The final to be scheduled for 1 June 2013, if there is a necessity to conclude the Ukrainian Premier League season with a "Golden Match".

 Originally scheduled for 30 May 2013, it was later planned to conduct on 1 June 2013. On 18 April 2013 the FFU Executive Committee rescheduled the match for 22 May 2013. On 24 April 2013 the FFU Executive Committee changed location of the final match from Olimpiysky in Kyiv to Metalist in Kharkiv.

Competition schedule

First Preliminary Round (1/64)

In this round entered 16 clubs from the Druha Liha and the finalists of Ukrainian Amateur Cup. The round matches were played on 25 July 2012.

Notes:
  Myr Hornostayivka informed the PFL that they will not travel for the scheduled match.(19 July 2012) Stal Dniprodzerzhynsk win the match with a 3–0 technical victory and advance into the next round.

 Hvardiyets Hvardiyske were drawn to play away against FC Bastion Illichivsk but they were omitted from the professional ranks prior to the start of the 2012–13 season.(13 July 2012) Hvardiyets Hvardiyske receive a bye into the next round.

Second Preliminary Round (1/32)

In this round entered all 17 clubs from Persha Liha (except Dynamo-2 Kyiv) and the higher seeded clubs from the Druha Liha (top four of each group). They were drawn against the nine winners of the First Preliminary Round. The matches were played 22 August 2012.

Notes:
 Hvardiyets Hvardiyske were originally drawn to be the away side.
However, the PFL regulations for the draw determine that a team from a lower level are designated as the home team. Match was played in Hvardiyske.

 Stal Dniprodzerzhynsk were originally drawn to play away against FC Lviv but they withdrew from the professional ranks prior to the start of the 2012–13 season. 
Stal Dniprodzerzhynsk receive a bye and advance to the First Round of the Cup competition.

Round of 32
In this round all 16 teams from the Premier League entered the competition. They and the 16 winners from the previous round consisting of seven clubs from the  Persha Liha and nine clubs from the Druha Liha were drawn in this round. The draw took place 5 September 2012 and was performed by Volodymyr Troshkin who was invited as a guest by the Premier League.

Notes:
 Fixture played at the CSC Nika Stadium located in the district center of Oleksandria, since the home ground has limited capacity.

Round of 16
In this round the 16 winners from the previous round consisting of 11 teams from the Premier League, two clubs from the Persha Liha and three clubs from the Druha Liha were drawn in this round. The draw took place September 26, 2012 and was performed by Mykhailo Fomenko who was invited as a guest by the Premier League.

Notes:
 Fixture played at the CSC Nika Stadium located in the district center of Oleksandria, since the home ground has limited capacity.

Quarterfinals
In this round entered the eight winners from the previous round consisting of seven teams from the Premier League and a club from the Persha Liha were drawn in this round. The draw took place 1 November 2012 and was performed by former Ukrainian international player Ivan Hetsko but due unforeseen circumstance was not able attend the draw. The draw was performed by former Ukrainian international player Vladyslav Vashchuk.

Semifinals
In this round entered the four winners from the previous round consisting of three teams from the Premier League and a club from the Persha Liha were drawn in this round. The draw took place 19 April 2013 and was performed by former Ukrainian international player Ivan Hetsko. The home team for the final was selected as the winner of Sevastopol – Shakhtar match.

Final

Top goalscorers
The competition's top ten goalscorers including qualification rounds.

See also 
2012–13 Ukrainian Premier League
2012–13 Ukrainian First League
2012–13 Ukrainian Second League
2012–13 UEFA Europa League

References

Cup
Ukrainian Cup
Ukrainian Cup seasons